Jacqueline Dutheil de la Rochère (born 1940) is a French aristocrat, Professor Emerita of Law and former President of Panthéon-Assas University in Paris.

Early life
Jacqueline de Raguet de Brancion was born on December 18, 1940 in Nîmes, France. Her father was Jacques Chatel de Raguet de Brancion and her mother, Françoise Barbier.

She graduated from Sciences Po. She received a Doctorate in Law and the agrégation from Paris Descartes University in 1988.

Career
She taught Public Law at Panthéon-Assas University. She served as its President.

She serves as President and Director of EJ BARBIER. She also serves on the Board of Directors of EPC Groupe.

Personal life
She married Stéphane Marie Jacques Dutheil de La Rochère in 1966.

See also
Lords of Brancion

References

Living people
1940 births
People from Nîmes
Sciences Po alumni
Paris Descartes University alumni
Presidents of Panthéon-Assas University
Academic staff of Paris 2 Panthéon-Assas University
French jurists